Rhyopsocus texanus is a species of bird nest barklouse in the family Psoquillidae. It is found in Central America and North America.

References

Trogiomorpha
Articles created by Qbugbot
Insects described in 1930